The Belomitridae are a taxonomic family of large sea snails, often known as whelks.

Genera
 Belomitra P. Fischer, 1883
Genera brought into synonymy
 Pleurobela Monterosato [in Locard], 1897: synonym of Belomitra P. Fischer, 1883

References

 Bouchet P., Rocroi J.P., Hausdorf B., Kaim A., Kano Y., Nützel A., Parkhaev P., Schrödl M. & Strong E.E. (2017). Revised classification, nomenclator and typification of gastropod and monoplacophoran families. Malacologia. 61(1-2): 1-526

External links
  Kantor Yu.I., Puillandre N., Rivasseau A. & Bouchet P. (2012) Neither a buccinid nor a turrid: A new family of deep-sea snails for Belomitra P. Fischer, 1883 (Mollusca, Neogastropoda), with a review of Recent Indo-Pacific species. Zootaxa 3496: 1–64

 
Buccinoidea